Alexander Sergeyevich Galushka (born December 1, 1975, Klin, Moscow Oblast, USSR) is a Russian politician, co-chairman of Business Russia association, co-chairman of the Central Headquarters of the People's Front for Russia, managing partner of Key Partner, chairman of the management board of the Center for Evaluation and Management Consulting, chairman of the Russian Board of Appraisers, and professor at the Higher school of Economics.

On September 11, 2013, he became the Minister of the Development of the Russian Far East in Dmitry Medvedev's First Cabinet.

References

1975 births
Living people
United Russia politicians
21st-century Russian politicians
Government ministers of Russia
Academic staff of the Higher School of Economics
Russian State Social University alumni